Baggy Pants and the Nitwits is a 1977 American animated series produced by DePatie-Freleng Enterprises and broadcast on NBC.

Overview 
Though the characters appeared together in the show's introduction, they each appeared separately in their own episodes. Each 30-minute episode of Baggy Pants and the Nitwits contained two segments: one for Baggy Pants and the other for the Nitwits.

Baggy Pants is an anthropomorphic cat mimicking Charlie Chaplin's "Little Tramp" character, right down to Chaplin's signature toothbrush mustache and walking cane. Similar to Chaplin and the Pink Panther, Baggy Pants performed all of his misadventures in pantomime, without a spoken dialogue by any of the characters in his segments.

The Nitwits is about an elderly superhero named Tyrone (voiced by Arte Johnson) who, by public demand, re-emerged from retirement to again fight crime, taking cases at his own discretion with help from his wife Gladys (Ruth Buzzi) and his hopping cane which he called "Elmo" which, among other things, helped Tyrone and Gladys to fly.

Johnson and Buzzi adapted and reprised the roles they had originated in Rowan & Martin's Laugh-In, with much of the adult innuendo (including Tyrone's original last name Horneigh) being removed to keep the cartoon family-friendly. In the opening titles of The Nitwits segment, Johnson himself was credited with having "created The Nitwits for television".

The series ran for 13 episodes; as of 2019, it has yet to be released on home video.

Episodes

Cast 
 Ruth Buzzi - Gladys
 Arte Johnson - Tyrone

References

External links 
 
 
 Baggy Pants and the Nitwits at SaturdayMorning.Pop-Cult.com
 Baggy Pants and the Nitwits at Toonarific.com

1977 American television series debuts
1977 American television series endings
1970s American animated television series
American children's animated superhero television series
Animated television series about cats
NBC original programming
Television series by DePatie–Freleng Enterprises